"Hold Onto Our Love" is a single by Welsh singer James Fox, who was best known for his appearance as a contestant on the second series of the talent show Fame Academy in 2003.

At Eurovision

The song was performed 20th on the night, following 's Blue Café with "Love Song" and preceding ' Lisa Andreas with "Stronger Every Minute". At the close of voting, it had received 29 points, placing 16th in a field of 24.

Charts

References

External links
"Hold Onto Our Love" at the Diggiloo Trush

Eurovision songs of the United Kingdom
Eurovision songs of 2004
Songs written by Tim Woodcock
2004 songs
Sony Music singles